Shadow-X (also known as the Dark X-Men) is a supervillain group appearing in American comic books published by Marvel Comics. The characters only appeared in New Excalibur. All of their costumes are the colors of black and red.

They are not officially given a name until New Excalibur #19 where they are referred to as Shadow-X in the "Previously..." section and by Juggernaut on the final page of the issue. How this name came about is unexplained, and prior to this the team was called the Dark X-Men by fans, reviews, and even the Marvel preview descriptions. It refers to the fact that the team was created and controlled by the Shadow King - the Shadow King's "Shadow X"-Men.

Fictional team biography
They are from an alternate dimension and were brought to the mainstream Marvel dimension during the events of Decimation. The Shadow King took control of the Professor Xavier of their reality and then was able to subvert all of the X-Men to serve him. When they were brought to Earth-616 the Dark Professor Xavier tried to bring Nocturne, Marvel Girl, and Shadowcat under his control, but he was defeated by them, with help from Sage, and later placed in Crossmore prison.

The rest of the team then ally themselves with Black Air, Albion, and Lionheart. They then tried to take control of Lionheart during a mission to free Dark Professor X. However, as Dark Professor X tried to take control Lionheart revealed Albion knew of their treachery and placed a device to stop his mind control and then placed a collar on Dark Professor Xavier to trap the Shadow King in Professor X and killed them both.

Lionheart then threatens the rest of Shadow-X, but this fight is interrupted by the immediate arrival of the New Excalibur team. New Excalibur is short-handed because of Nocturne's recent stroke and Sage infiltrating Albion's ranks, but they are able to effectively work as a team and successfully take down Shadow-X. New Excalibur and Shadow-X both try to stop Lionheart, but they are too busy with their opponent team to be successful and she escapes. Then New Excalibur start to interrogate the Shadow-X about what was happening between them and Lionheart.

Shadow-X team up with New Excalibur to fight their common foe, Albion. It is revealed that the collar placed on the Dark Professor X actually killed him. When Dark Cyclops, Dark Angel, and Pete Wisdom attack Albion, Dark Cyclops is beheaded by Sage who is working undercover in Albion's Shadow Corps. Dark Angel and Wisdom retreat after Dark Cyclops's death, but Sage (now called Britannia) and other members of the Shadow Corps follow. Dazzler, Juggernaut, and Dark Beast join the battle, and during it Sage kills Dark Beast by impaling him with her sword. During a subsequent battle between Dark Marvel Girl and Dark Angel and the Shadow Captains, Dark Angel is killed and his wing severed by one of the Shadow Captains.

In the final battle against Albion, Dark Marvel Girl is mortally wounded while saving Nocturne's life. Still, despite her injuries, Jean and Nocturne find the source of the technology blackout. Meanwhile, Lionheart helps Dark Iceman against the rest of the Shadow Captains before he dies and withers away into a skeleton. With his last breath, Dark Iceman banished the vast majority of the snow he’d created. Juggernaut, Dazzler, and Wisdom help Sage to overpower her Britannia personality. Sage then helps Cap against Albion. Together, they beat their foe as Dark Marvel Girl restores technology before she dies.

In the alternate future mini-series Genext United, a group resembling Shadow-X appear to be alive and well in this continuity. The story is written by Chris Claremont, the very same writer who created them.

Notes
The Dark Beast that is a part of this group is not the same as the one from the Age of Apocalypse. Furthermore, this version is in human form, unlike the Age of Apocalypse and Earth-616 versions.

References

External links
 

Characters created by Chris Claremont
X-Men supporting characters
Marvel Comics supervillain teams